WGAG-FM was a high school radio station at Oak Ridge High School in Orlando, Florida. The station operated on 89.3 MHz between 1977 and 1981.

History
On September 29, 1975, Oak Ridge applied for a construction permit for a new 10-watt noncommercial radio station to serve Orlando. The application, backed by faculty adviser and station manager Jack Howard, was approved in October 1976. WGAG-FM "FM 89", also known as "Green and Gold Radio" for the school's colors, began regular programming on November 3, 1977. Its regular programming included rock, beautiful music and easy listening programs, along with military-sponsored programs and political commentaries by the school's student body president as well as local and school news. Initially broadcasting from 6:30 a.m. to 6:30 p.m., its broadcast day was extended to 9 p.m. by 1979.

WGAG-FM operated with an array of equipment donated by seven local radio and television stations, as well as donated records and lumber for construction. Its transmitter had been manufactured in 1947, and the age of the donated equipment presented issues at times for staff. The station, operated by the school's radio club, ran on a shoestring budget: $200 a year, brought in by selling doughnuts and clearing lawns.

Oak Ridge's radio station, however, quickly found an insurmountable obstacle: a major change in Federal Communications Commission regulations relating to Class D 10-watt radio stations. In 1978, the FCC announced it would cease licensing new Class D stations and encouraged as many as possible to upgrade to "full-service" Class A operation, with an effective radiated power of at least 100 watts. The power increase was a financial impossibility for Oak Ridge High School, resulting in the closure of WGAG-FM in 1981 and the school instead pursuing the idea of creating a television production studio to be operated by students.

References

External links
 

GAG
Defunct radio stations in the United States
Radio stations established in 1977
Radio stations disestablished in 1981
1977 establishments in Florida
1981 disestablishments in Florida
High school radio stations in the United States
GAG-FM